Municipal and mayoral elections will be held in Lyon in March 2008, at the same time as other municipal elections. The current Mayor of Lyon Gérard Collomb (PS) should have faced UMP candidate Dominique Perben and MoDem candidate Christophe Geourjon, who finally chose to join the Perben list. Azouz Begag declined to seek the MoDem nomination. Another MoDem candidate was selected by François Bayrou a month before the elections as head of the MoDem list to replace Geourjon and other defectors both to the UMP-led and the PS-led lists.

In the 2001 French municipal elections, the Socialist Gérard Collomb won the country's second largest city from the UDF. Lyon had been considered a stronghold for the centrist UDF in previous years. In 2008, former UMP Transportation Minister Dominique Perben will try to win back the city. Surprisingly, the two highly presumed candidates for the centrist MoDem and the far-right National Front, Azouz Begag and Bruno Gollnisch respectively both announced their intentions not to stand. Two nationalist right-wing parties, the MPF and the DLC (led by Charles Millon), made agreements with Dominique Perben, who inserted their candidates on his list. Subsequently, former right-wing mayor Michel Noir has openly distanced himself from Perben, most notably in a February interview with the Lyon daily Le Progrès. For the same reason, François Bayrou has decided to maintain a separate MoDem list and not to support the Perben list.

Polls indicate that Collomb has approvals nearing 90% and is favored to win an easy re-election.

Results

1st Arrondissement

2nd Arrondissement

3rd Arrondissement

See also

2008 French municipal elections
2008 Paris municipal election
2008 Marseille municipal election

Lyon municipal election
Lyon municipal election
Municipal elections in France